Yekan-e Olya (also Romanized as Yekān-e ‘Olya and Yekān ‘Olyā; also known as Echan Yukāri, Eshan Bālā, Yakan Olya, Yekān-e Kahrīz-e ‘Olyā, Yekān Kahrīz, Yekān Kahrīz Bālā, Yekān Kahrīz-e Bālā, and Yukhari-Yechan) is a village in Yekanat Rural District, Yamchi District, Marand County, East Azerbaijan Province, Iran. At the 2006 census, its population was 1,156, in 303 families.

References 

Populated places in Marand County